is a subprefecture of Hokkaido Prefecture, Japan corresponding to the old province of Tokachi. As of 2004, its estimated population is 360,802 and its area is 10,830.99 km2.

Tokachi-Obihiro Airport is in the city of Obihiro.

Geography

Municipalities

Mergers

History 
November 1897: Kasai Subprefecture established.
August 1932: Kasai Subprefecture renamed Tokachi Subprefecture.
October 20, 1948: Ashoro District transferred from Kushiro Subprefecture.

References

External links
Official website 

Subprefectures in Hokkaido